Xu Ling (507–583) was the compiler and editor of the famous poetry anthology New Songs from the Jade Terrace during the poetically prolific Southern Dynasties era, 420–589. His courtesy name (zi) was Xiao Mu.

Biography
Xu Ling was born in what is now Tancheng County, Shandong Province, China, and early in life achieved fame for poetry and literature. He has achieved lasting renown for his anthology New Songs from the Jade Terrace, which he compiled under the patronage of Xiao Gang (503-551), first a prince, and who was then later known as Liang Jianwendi, after becoming Emperor of the Liang Dynasty, 549-551.

See also
Six Dynasties
New Songs from the Jade Terrace
Yu Xin

References

Web

Other
Watson, Burton (1971). Chinese Lyricism: Shih Poetry from the Second to the Twelfth Century. New York: Columbia University Press. 

Liang dynasty poets
507 births
583 deaths
Liang dynasty politicians
Chen dynasty poets
Chen dynasty politicians
6th-century Chinese poets
6th-century Chinese writers